Madana Mohini is a 1953 Indian Tamil language film directed by M. L. Pathi. The film featured P. V. Narasimha Bharathi, C. R. Rajakumari and Pollachi Kamala in the lead roles.

Plot 
A king who is a non-believer in God, has a son and two nieces. The nieces are very pious. One of them, Madana, performs prayers but the king does not like it. Madana guises herself as a male, gets out of the palace and joins a gang of robbers. The gang, like Robin Hood, robs the rich and help the poor. The prince, also in disguise, meets Madana and tells her that he knows a secret way to the palace room where three precious stones are kept. They go together to rob but takes only one precious stone. But both of them are found and arrested. The king discovers who they really are. He had an idea of marrying his son to the other niece, Mohini but now realises that his son wants to marry Madana. After many twists and turns finally the prince and Madana are united.

Cast 
Cast according to the opening credits of the film

Male cast
 Narasimha Bharathi
 Veerappa
 M. L. Pathi
 Navaneetham
 Pulimoottai
 Ezhumalai
 Loose Arumugam
 Velappa
 K. R. V. Rao

Female cast
 C. R. Rajakumari
 Pollachi Kamala
 Angamuthu
 Kantha Bai
 Yasodhara
 Saraswathi
 Pattammal
 Shantha
 Aparanji

Crew 
The list is compiled from Film News Anandan's database.
Director: M. L. Pathi
Story: Kayatkannazhakan
Dialogues: M. V. Sivam, K. V. Parthasarathy
Cinematography: Prabhakar
Editing: C. Rajam
Stunt: V. M. Purushothama Naidu, Vittal
Studio: Citadel

Production 
The filming was done under the guidance of Jyotish Sinha, a Bengali film personality who was based in Chennai.

Soundtrack 
Music was composed by K. V. Mahadevan while the lyrics were penned by M. P. Sivam. Playback singers are A. P. Komala, N. L. Ganasaraswathi, K. V. Mahadevan, Jikki, G. Kasthoori, P. Leela, K. R. Lakshmi and A. M. Appadurai.

References 

Indian action films
Cross-dressing in Indian films
Robin Hood films
Films scored by K. V. Mahadevan
1950s action films